Captain William Charles Bonaparte-Wyse (20 January 1826 – 3 December 1892) was an Irish soldier and poet.

Early life
William Charles Bonaparte-Wyse was born in Waterford, the son of the politician and educational reformer Sir Thomas Wyse, and Laetitia, daughter of Lucien Bonaparte.

Career
Nicknamed lo felibre irlandés, he wrote in Provençal, was a friend of Frédéric Mistral, and became the only foreign member of the consistory of the Félibrige, the Provençal cultural association. His collection Li Parpaioun Blu (The Blue Butterflies) was published in 1868, with a foreword by Mistral. He created the Provençal dish of dried figs poached in whiskey.

Bonaparte-Wyse was appointed High Sheriff of County Waterford for 1855. He was commissioned Captain in the 9th Wiltshire Rifle Volunteer Corps in July 1866. He also served in the Waterford Artillery.

Personal life
He married in 1864, in London, Ellen Linzee Prout (1842–1925, niece of Servant of God Sister Elizabeth Prout), and they had four sons. He was the father of Permanent Secretary Andrew Nicholas Bonaparte-Wyse (1870–1940). His eldest son's godfather was Frédéric Mistral.

Death
He died, aged 66, in 1892, at Cannes, and is buried there in the Cimetière du Grand Jas.

References

Further reading
"William Bonaparte-Wyse, un Provençal d’Irlande" edition N° 114, 1992 of La France latine, Revue d’études d’oc

External links
Copy of Li Parpaioun Blu in Provençal and French, from the University of Provence
Bonaparte-Wyse Papers, Collection List No. 119, National Library of Ireland

William
1826 births
1892 deaths
People from County Waterford
Irish poets
Volunteer Force officers
Burials at the Cimetière du Grand Jas
High Sheriffs of County Waterford
19th-century Irish poets
Irish people of French descent
People of Corsican descent